The Communauté de communes Saâne et Vienne (CCSV) is a former intercommunality in the Seine-Maritime département of the Normandy region of north-western France. It was created in January 2002. It was merged into the new Communauté de communes Terroir de Caux in January 2017.

Participants 
The Communauté de communes comprised the following communes:

Ambrumesnil
Auppegard
Auzouville-sur-Saâne
Avremesnil
Bacqueville-en-Caux
Biville-la-Rivière
Brachy
Gonnetot
Greuville		
Gruchet-Saint-Siméon
Gueures
Hermanville
Lamberville
Lammerville
Lestanville
Longueil
Luneray
Omonville
Ouville-la-Rivière
Quiberville
Rainfreville
Royville
Saâne-Saint-Just
Saint-Denis-d'Aclon
Saint-Mards
Saint-Ouen-le-Mauger
Saint-Pierre-Bénouville
Sassetot-le-Malgardé
Thil-Manneville
Tocqueville-en-Caux
Vénestanville

See also
Communes of the Seine-Maritime department

References 

Saane et Vienne